Sharadamma Ramanjaneya was the 45th Mayor of Bangalore (Bruhat Bangalore Mahanagara Palike). She was also the fifth woman mayor of the city. She became a mayor in 2011.

Career 
In 2011, Sharadamma contested in the Bruhat Bangalore Mahanagara Palike (BBMP) election as a candidate of Bharatiya Janata Party (BJP) from Shettihalli. After winning in the election she became a mayor of the city and S Harish became the deputy mayor. Her term ended in 2012.

References 

Mayors of Bangalore
Bharatiya Janata Party politicians from Karnataka
Year of birth missing (living people)
Living people